Rebecca Wolff (born 29 November 1967 New York City) is a poet, fiction writer, and the editor and creator of both Fence Magazine and Fence Books.

Wolff has won the 2001 National Poetry Series Award and 2003 Barnard Women Poets Prize for her literature.

Life
Wolff received her MFA from the Iowa Writers Workshop, where she was a student editor of the Iowa Review.

She created Fence Magazine in 1998, with an editorial staff including Jonathan Lethem, Frances Richard, Caroline Crumpacker, and Matthew Rohrer, and Fence Books in 2001.  Fence is now headquartered at the University at Albany, where Wolff is a fellow at the New York State Writers Institute.

She was married from 2002 until 2012 to the novelist Ira Sher. She lives in Hudson, New York with their children.

On June 25, 2019 Wolff was elected alderman for Hudson's First Ward for the 2020-2021 term.

Awards
 2001 National Poetry Series for Manderley.
 2003 Barnard Women Poets Prize for Figment.

Works

Anthology
 Not for Mothers Only, Contemporary Poems on Child-Getting and Child Rearing, co-edited with Catherine Wagner, was published in 2007.

Novel
 The Beginners was published in 2011 by Riverhead Books.

Editor

References

External links
Hear Wolff reading with Catherine Wagner
 Audio: Rebecca Wolff reads "Breeder Sonnet" from the book The King (via poemsoutloud.net)
Fence Magazine
Fence Books
"Rebecca Wolff — The Story of Fence", Jacket 12
Poetry by Rebecca Wolff, The Commonline Journal, #011
Brooklyn Rail Rebecca Wolff with Jade Sharma

1967 births
Living people
University at Albany, SUNY faculty
Iowa Writers' Workshop alumni
Writers from New York City
American women poets
20th-century American poets
20th-century American women writers
21st-century American poets
21st-century American novelists
21st-century American women writers